Susan Lipper (born 1953) is an American photographer, based in New York City. Her books include Grapevine (1994), for which she is best known, Trip (2000) and Domesticated Land (2018). Lipper has said that all of her work is "subjective documentary"; the critic Gerry Badger has said many describe it as "ominous".

Lipper is the recipient of a Guggenheim Fellowship. Her work is held in the collections of the Metropolitan Museum of Art and New York Public Library in New York City, Minneapolis Institute of Art, Museum of Contemporary Art, Los Angeles, and the National Portrait Gallery and Victoria and Albert Museum in London.

Life and work
Lipper received an MFA in photography from Yale University in 1983. She uses a medium format camera, a Hasselblad, sometimes with attached flash.

For about 20 years she has been visiting and photographing a tiny community in Grapevine Hollow in the Appalachian Mountains in West Virginia, eastern United States. The photographs she made there between 1988 and 1994, in collaboration with her subjects the residents, became her first book Grapevine. The critic Gerry Badger has written that "Community, family, and gender relationships seem to be at the core of her investigation." Lipper's collaborative approach distinguishes Grapevine from social documentary photography; she describes it as "subjective documentary". Izabela Radwanska Zhang wrote in the British Journal of Photography that it "challenges our belief in images labelled 'photojournalism', by interweaving a theatrical element. Lipper asked her models to assume characters that could essentially be them in the images; the result is a slippery, mysterious work."

Trip, made between 1993 and 1999, paired photographs of urban landscapes and interiors with writing by Frederick Barthelme. Domesticated Land was made between 2012 and 2016 in the California desert.

Publications

Books of work by Lipper
Innocence & the Birth of Jealousy. Rushden, UK: Omphalos, 1974.
Grapevine: Photographs by Susan Lipper. Manchester, UK: Cornerhouse, 1994. .
Limited edition. New York: powerHouse, 1997. .
Trip. Photographs by Lipper with accompanying short texts by Frederick Barthelme.
Stockport, UK: Dewi Lewis, 2000. .
Brooklyn, New York: powerHouse, 2000. .
Bed and Breakfast. Country life 4. Maidstone, UK: Photoworks, 2000. . Edited by Val Williams. With an essay by David Chandler. Edition of 1000 copies.
Domesticated Land. London: Mack, 2018. .

Books with contributions by Lipper
How We Are: Photographing Britain from the 1840s to the Present. Edited by Val Williams and Susan Bright. London: Tate, 2007. .

Awards
2015: Guggenheim Fellowship from the John Simon Guggenheim Memorial Foundation

Collections
Lipper's work is held in the following permanent collections:
Metropolitan Museum of Art, New York City
Minneapolis Institute of Art, Minneapolis, Minnesota: 1 print (as of 30 August 2021)
Museum of Contemporary Art, Los Angeles
National Portrait Gallery, London: 4 prints
New York Public Library, New York City
Victoria and Albert Museum, London: 7 prints (as of 30 August 2021)

References

External links

"ICP Lecture Series 2010: Susan Lipper" (video) – Lipper describes her career

Photographers from New York City
20th-century American photographers
21st-century American photographers
20th-century American women photographers
21st-century American women photographers
Living people
1953 births